George White Pratt (March 23, 1840 – January 17, 1899) was a member of the Wisconsin State Assembly and the Wisconsin State Senate.

Biography
Pratt was born on March 23, 1840 in East Haddam, Connecticut. He moved to Oshkosh, Wisconsin in 1871, where he "was one of the leading lumber dealers in the state".

Career
Pratt was elected to the Senate in 1890. He was a member of the Assembly the previous year. Additionally, he was Mayor of Oshkosh and a member of the Winnebago County, Wisconsin, as well as a delegate to the 1884 Democratic National Convention.

Pratt died at his home in Oshkosh, after two years of declining health.

References

People from East Haddam, Connecticut
Politicians from Oshkosh, Wisconsin
Democratic Party Wisconsin state senators
Democratic Party members of the Wisconsin State Assembly
Mayors of places in Wisconsin
1840 births
1899 deaths
19th-century American politicians